I-60 was an Imperial Japanese Navy  cruiser submarine of the KD3B sub-class commissioned in 1928. In 1939, she was involved in a collision that sank her sister ship . She served in World War II, supporting Japanese forces during the Dutch East Indies campaign in early 1942 until she was sunk by a British destroyer on 17 January 1942 during her first war patrol.

Design and description
The submarines of the KD3B sub-class were essentially repeats of the preceding KD3A sub-class with minor modifications to improve seakeeping. They displaced  surfaced and  submerged.

For surface running, the submarines were powered by two  diesel engines, each driving one propeller shaft. When submerged each propeller was driven by a  electric motor. They could reach  on the surface and  submerged.

The submarines were armed with eight internal  torpedo tubes, six in the bow and two in the stern. They carried one reload for each tube for a total of 16 torpedoes. The submarines were also armed with one  deck gun.

Construction and commissioning

I-60 was built by the Sasebo Naval Arsenal at Sasebo, Japan. Her keel was laid on 10 October 1927 and she was launched on 24 April 1929. She was completed and commissioned on either 20 or 24 December 1929, according to various sources.

Service history

Pre-World War II

1929–1938
On the day of her commissioning, I-60 was attached to the Sasebo Naval District and she and her sister ship  were assigned to Submarine Division 28, which was activated the same day. Sources differ on whether Submarine Division 28 immediately was assigned to Submarine Squadron 2 in the 2nd Fleet, a component of the Combined Fleet, or was assigned directly to the Sasebo Naval District at first and then assigned to Submarine Squadron 2 on 1 December 1930.

On 1 December 1932, Submarine Division 28 was reassigned to Submarine Squadron 1 in the 1st Fleet, also a component of the Combined Fleet. The division was reassigned to the Sasebo Defense Division in the Sasebo Naval District on 15 November 1933, and that day I-60 was decommissioned and placed in reserve. While she was in reserve, the division was reassigned to the Sasebo Guard Squadron in the Sasebo Naval District on 11 December 1933.

Submarine Division 28 returned to duty in Submarine Squadron 2 in the 2nd Fleet on 15 November 1934. Apparently recommissioning in 1934, On 7 February 1935 I-60 got underway from Sasebo along with the other eight submarines of Submarine Squadron 2 — I-53, I-54, I-55, I-59, and  — for a training cruise in the Kuril Islands. The cruise concluded with their arrival at Sukumo Bay on 25 February 1935. I-60 was anchored in the Terashima Strait with I-59 and I-63 on 22 July 1936 during fleet exercises when large waves swamped her, causing minor damage to her superstructure and carrying away her starboard anchor chain and  work boat. She apparently was out of commission later in 1936.

I-60 recommissioned on 1 December 1936 while Submarine Division 28 was still operating in the 1st Fleet as part of Submarine Squadron 1. On 27 March 1937, she put to sea from Sasebo with I-59 and I-63 for a training cruise in the vicinity of Tsingtao, China. They concluded it with their arrival at Ariake Bay on 6 April 1937. Submarine Division 28 was reassigned to the Sasebo Defense Squadron in the Sasebo Naval District on 1 December 1937, but returned to duty with Submarine Squadron 1 in the 1st Fleet on 15 December 1938.

Collision with I-63

In January 1939, I-60 and the other submarines of Submarine Squadron 1 got underway for fleet exercises. Early on the morning of 2 February 1939, the submarines were on their way to their assigned stations for a simulated attack against Japanese surface ships also taking part in the exercises.

I-60, proceeding on the surface at  toward her own assigned station, mistakenly entered I-63′s assigned area due to a navigation error. At around 05:00 I-60′s watch officer sighted two white lights belonging to I-63. I-60′s lookouts misidentified I-63′s lights as those of two fishing boats in close proximity to one another. I-60′s watch officer decided to pass between the supposed fishing boats, unwittingly putting I-60 on a collision course with I-63. He ordered I-60 to turn in the hope of avoiding a collision. Meanwhile, I-63′s crew called her commanding officer to her bridge, which he reached in time to see that I-60 was about to ram his submarine. He issued a command for I-63 to go to all ahead full and ordered her crew to close all watertight doors.

By the time the two submarines sighted each other, it was too late to avoid a collision, and I-60 rammed I-63. The impact tore open I-63′s starboard ballast tank and auxiliary machinery compartment. I-60, which had suffered a crushed bow buoyancy tank, rescued I-63′s commanding officer and six other crewmen. They were  only survivors.

As the result of the post-accident investigation, a court of inquiry found that I-60′s navigation error had contributed to the accident and that I-60 had unsatisfactory lookout procedures and inadequate management of her watch officers. Although off the bridge and below at the time of the collision, I-60′s commanding officer took full responsibility for the accident. After a trial by court-martial, he was suspended from duty, and his later promotion from lieutenant commander to commander was delayed.

1939–1941

On 15 November 1939, Submarine Division 28 was attached to the Sasebo Naval District and transferred to duty at the submarine school at Kure, Japan. On 15 November 1940, the division was reassigned to Submarine Squadron 5 in the Combined Fleet.  I-60 temporarily relieved I-59 as division flagship from 6 to 29 January 1941.

I-60 was placed in Third Reserve at Sasebo on 10 April 1941 and later moved to the Tama Zosensho shipyard at Tamano, Japan, for a refit and modernization. She became the flagship of Submarine Division 28 again on 20 May 1941, serving as such until 3 December 1941, when I-59 relieved her.

World War II

December 1941–January 1942
Nominally assigned to the Malaya Invasion Force for the Pacific campaign of World War II, I-60 still was undergoing modernization at Tamano when the war in the Pacific began with the Japanese attack on Pearl Harbor, Hawaii, on 7 December 1941 (8 December on the other side of the International Date Line in Japan). On 26 December 1941, she was reassigned to Submarine Unit B, tasked to operate in the Indian Ocean. With the commander of Submarine Division 28 aboard, she got underway from Kobe, Japan, on 31 December 1941 in company with I-59, bound for Davao City on Mindanao in the Philippines. The two submarines arrived at Davao on 5 January 1942 and refueled there. While at Davao,  again became the flagship of Submarine Division 28 on 9 January 1942.

First war patrol

On 10 January 1942, I-60 departed Davao City in company with I-59 to begin her first war patrol. On 13 January, I-60 parted company with I-59 and proceeded to a patrol area in the Indian Ocean south of the Sunda Strait between Java and Sumatra, after which she was to proceed to Penang in Japanese-occupied British Malaya. Early on the morning of 16 January 1942, she reported her arrival in her patrol area south of the Sunda Strait, and on the evening of 16 January she transmitted a status report. The Japanese never heard from her again.

Loss

Jupiter detached from Mount Vernon and began an asdic search. Two hours later, she gained contact on the submerged I-60 and made two depth charge attacks. Heavily damaged, I-60 surfaced astern of Jupiter, too close for Jupiter to depress her main armament enough to open fire on I-60.

Unable to submerge, I-60 engaged Jupiter with her  deck gun. Jupiter changed course and opened fire on I-60 with her starboard Oerlikon 20-millimeter antiaircraft gun, killing and wounding I-60 crewmen who emerged from her conning tower to man her deck gun. Despite this, I-60′s crew kept emerging on deck to replace fallen gunners, and I-60 managed to fire seven or eight rounds a minute, one of which knocked out Jupiter′s open-backed "A"  twin gun turret, killing three men and wounding nine. British records subsequently stated that "The enemy submarine was fought with great determination, her gun′s crews being continually reinforced from inside the submarine until put out of action."

Jupiter fired two torpedoes at I-60, both of which missed, then opened fire on I-60 with her remaining four  guns, scoring two or three hits. With her deck gun no longer manned, I-60 took on a list as smoke poured from her. Her 7.7-millimeter machine gun continued to fire from her conning tower at Jupiter, which closed with I-60 at high speed and silenced the machine gun with 20-millimeter fire. Jupiter hit I-60 with a  round between her conning tower and stern, causing an internal explosion aboard the submarine. Flame and smoke emerged from the conning tower, which Jupiter′s crew believed was on fire. Jupiter then passed  abeam of I-60 and dropped a depth charge set to detonate at a shallow depth. Its explosion blew a Japanese sailor out of I-60′s conning tower and caused flames to rise  from it.

Jupiter picked up only three survivors, one of whom later died; 84 or 86 members of I-60′s crew were lost, according to different sources. The Japanese struck I-60 from the navy list on 10 March 1942.

References

Footnotes

Bibliography
 

1929 ships
Ships built by Sasebo Naval Arsenal
Kaidai-class submarines
World War II submarines of Japan
Japanese submarine accidents
Maritime incidents in 1936
Maritime incidents in 1939
Maritime incidents in January 1942
Japanese submarines lost during World War II
Submarines sunk by British warships
World War II shipwrecks in the Indian Ocean